The Hunstanton Formation is a lithostratigraphic name applied to an early Cretaceous limestone succession in eastern England which was formerly known as Red Chalk. The type section is at Hunstanton Cliff in northwest Norfolk.

References

Formation, Hunstanton Formation
Lower Cretaceous Series of Europe
Upper Cretaceous Series of Europe
Albian Stage
Cenomanian Stage
Geology of England
Chalk